Tylos punctatus is a species of woodlouse in the family Tylidae. It is found in Central America, North America, South America, and Mexico.

Subspecies
These two subspecies belong to the species Tylos punctatus:
 Tylos punctatus insularis Van Name, 1936
 Tylos punctatus punctatus Holmes & Gay, 1909

References

External links

 

Woodlice
Articles created by Qbugbot
Crustaceans described in 1909